Yuting Zhang is a professor of health economics at the University of Melbourne, and an expert on economic evaluations of health policy and healthcare reforms. She is a journal editor, award recipient, and has written numerous articles in influential journals in her field.

Biography  

Professor Zhang obtained her PhD in health policy (economics concentration) at Harvard University in 2007 and MS in health policy & management, also from Harvard University. She received her BA from Renmin University of China.

Yuting Zhang is currently a professor of health economics at the Melbourne Institute: Applied Economic & Social Research within the Faculty of Business and Economics at the University of Melbourne. Before that, she was a tenured professor at the University of Pittsburgh. She was the founding director of the Pharmaceutical Economics Research Group since 2010.

Her expertise is with using advanced econometrics and statistical methods and large data sets to design rigorous observational studies to study causal relationship between health policy/interventions and outcomes including patient health, healthcare spending, and quality of care. These empirical studies are motivated by two overarching goals: first, to design studies to identify causal relationships between health policy/interventions and health outcomes rather than mere correlations; second, to provide guidance on how health policies can be designed to achieve efficiency and high quality of care in the healthcare system.

Her research areas include pharmaceutical policy and economics, mental health policy, value-based healthcare design, comparative effectiveness analysis, health insurance markets, the effect of healthcare reforms on healthcare spending and quality of care, and international health.

Zhang's research has been published in prestigious medicine, health policy, and economics journals such as the New England Journal of Medicine, Health Affairs, and the American Economic Review.

Zhang has been interviewed extensively by reporters from television or radio broadcast, magazines and newspapers, including The New York Times, The Wall Street Journal, American Health Line, USA Today  Business Week, The Washington Post, ABC News  and CBS News 

She is an associate editor of the Journal of Mental Health Policy and Economics, and an appointed method/statistical reviewer at JAMA Network Open. She has also served as a consulting advisor to the Institute of Medicine and the Centers for Medicare and Medicaid Services, and a reviewer for the NIH, Patient-Centered Outcomes Research Institute, and the US Medicare Payment Advisory Commission.

Major projects 

Zhang has led several large-scale projects with funding from the U.S. National Academies of Sciences, Engineering, and Medicine, the U.S. National Institutes of Health (NIH), Agency for Healthcare Research and Quality, and the Commonwealth Fund. Zhang is the recipient of an Australian Research Council Australian Future Fellowship award to study how to reform private health insurance in Australia.

Selected publications 
Zhang has published in hundreds of journals on the economics of public policy, including top economic and Health journals
 Zhang Y*, Newhouse JP, Baicker K. Are Drugs Substitutes or Complements for Intensive (and Expensive) Medical Treatment? American Economic Review. 2011 May; 101 (3):393-97. PMCID: 3778446.
 Liu L, Zhang Y*. Does non-employment based health insurance promote entrepreneurship? Evidence from a policy experiment in China. Journal of Comparative Economics. May 2017. https://doi.org/10.1016/j.jce.2017.04.003.
 Zhang Y, Ma Q, Chen Y, Gao H. Effects of Public Hospital Reforms on Inpatient Expenditures in Rural China. Health Economics. 2016 Feb. doi: 10.1002/hec.3320 .
 Kaplan CM, Zhang Y*. Anticipatory Behavior In Response To Medicare Part D's Coverage Gap. Health Economics. 2016 Jan. doi: 10.1002/hec.3311.
 Kaplan CM, Zhang Y*. The January Effect: Medication Reinitiation among Medicare Part D Beneficiaries. Health Economics. 2014 Nov 14; 23 (11):1287-300. PMCID: 3841288 .
 Kaplan C, Zhang Y*. Assessing the comparative-effectiveness of antidepressants commonly prescribed for depression in the US Medicare population. The journal of mental health policy and economics. 2012 Dec; 15 (4):171-8. PMCID: PMC3608926. .
 Baik SH, Rollman BL, Reynolds CF 3rd, Lave JR, Smith KJ, Zhang Y*. The effect of the US Medicare Part D coverage gaps on medication use among patients with depression and heart failure. The Journal of Mental Health Policy and Economics. 2012 Sep; 15 (3):105-18. PMCID: PMC3471664. .
 Zhang Y*. Cost-saving effects of olanzapine as long-term treatment for bipolar disorder. The journal of mental health policy and economics. 2008 Sep; 11 (3):135-46. .
 Huskamp HA, Frank RG, McGuigan K, Zhang Y. The Impact of A Three-Tier Formulary on Demand Response for Prescription Drugs. Journal of Economics and Management Strategy. 2005; 14 (3):729-753. .
 San-Juan-Rodriguez A, Zhang Y, He M, Hernandez I. Association of Antidementia Therapies with Time to Skilled Nursing Facility Admission and Cardiovascular Events among Elderly Adults with Alzheimer Disease. JAMA Network Open; March 2019;2(3):e190213. doi:10.1001/jamanetworkopen.2019.0213
 Hernandez I, He M, Brooks M, Zhang Y. Exposure-Response Association between Concurrent Opioid and Benzodiazepine Use and Risk of Opioid-Related Overdose in Medicare Part D Beneficiaries. JAMA Network Open. June 2018;1(2):e180919. doi:10.1001/jamanetworkopen.2018.0919.
 Zhang Y*, Baicker K, Newhouse JP. Geographic variation in the quality of prescribing. The New England journal of medicine. 2010 Nov 18; 363 (21):1985-8. PMCID: PMC3047447.  
 Zhang Y*, Baicker K, Newhouse JP. Geographic variation in Medicare drug spending. The New England journal of medicine. 2010 Jul 29; 363 (5):405-9. PMCID: PMC3364516. 
 Zhang Y*, Donohue JM, Lave JR, O’Donnell G, Newhouse JP. The effect of Medicare Part D on drug and medical spending. The New England journal of medicine. 2009 Jul 2; 361 (1):52-61. PMCID: PMC2859614. . 
 Zhang Y*, Baik SH, Fendrick AM, Baicker K. Comparing local and regional variation in health care spending. The New England journal of medicine. 2012 Nov; 367 (18):1724-31. PMCID: PMC3490218. . 
 Zhang Y*, Baik SH, Zhou L, Reynolds CF, Lave JR. Effects of Medicare Part D coverage gap on medication and medical treatment among elderly beneficiaries with depression. JAMA Psychiatry (formerly Archives of General Psychiatry). 2012 Jul; 69 (7): 672-9. PMCID: PMC3390754. .

Awards 

Professor Zhang has received multiple international awards including:
 Australian Research Council Australian Future Fellowship award 2021-2025
 Australian-American Health Policy Fellowship 2016-2017
 Excellence in Mental Health Policy and Economics Research Award 2009
Hong Kong Hang Seng Bank Overseas Scholarship 1997 - 1999
 Thomas O. Pyle Fellow, Harvard Medical School 2006-2007
 Honors Convocations Award Recipient, University of Pittsburgh 2012, 2014, 2017
 Dean's Certificate for Research Excellence, University of Melbourne

References 

Living people
Academic staff of the University of Melbourne
Health economists
Harvard Graduate School of Arts and Sciences alumni
Year of birth missing (living people)